Mont Iboundji is a peak located in Gabon.

Other sources indicate the Mont Bengoué as the most elevated peak in Gabon.

The mountain is also the namesake of the frontrunners in the Modern Jazz movement, Iboundji.

Notes

See also
 Geography of Gabon

Iboundji